The Kripke–Platek set theory (KP), pronounced , is an axiomatic set theory developed by Saul Kripke and Richard Platek.
The theory can be thought of as roughly the predicative part of ZFC and is considerably weaker than it.

Axioms 
In its formulation, a Δ0 formula is one all of whose quantifiers are bounded.

 Axiom of extensionality: Two sets are the same if and only if they have the same elements.
 Axiom of induction: φ(a) being a formula, if for all sets x the assumption that φ(y) holds for all elements y of x entails that φ(x) holds, then φ(x) holds for all sets x.
 Axiom of empty set: There exists a set with no members, called the empty set and denoted {}.
 Axiom of pairing: If x, y are sets, then so is {x, y}, a set containing x and y as its only elements.
 Axiom of union: For any set x, there is a set y such that the elements of y are precisely the elements of the elements of x.
 Axiom of Δ0-separation: Given any set and any Δ0 formula φ(x), there is a subset of the original set containing precisely those elements x for which φ(x) holds. (This is an axiom schema.)
 Axiom of Δ0-collection: Given any Δ0 formula φ(x, y), if for every set x there exists a set y such that φ(x, y) holds, then for all sets X there exists a set Y such that for every x in X there is a y in Y such that φ(x, y) holds.

Some but not all authors include an 
 Axiom of infinity

KP with infinity is denoted by KPω. These axioms lead to close connections between KP, generalized recursion theory, and the theory of admissible ordinals.
KP can be studied as a constructive set theory by dropping the law of excluded middle, without changing any axioms.

Empty set 
If any set  is postulated to exist, such as in the axiom of infinity, then the axiom of empty set is redundant because it is equal to the subset . Furthermore, the existence of a member in the universe of discourse, i.e., ∃x(x=x), is implied in certain formulations of first-order logic, in which case the axiom of empty set follows from the axiom of Δ0-separation, and is thus redundant.

Comparison with Zermelo-Fraenkel set theory 
As noted, the above are weaker than ZFC as they exclude the power set axiom, choice, and sometimes infinity. Also the axioms of separation and collection here are weaker than the corresponding axioms in ZFC because the formulas φ used in these are limited to bounded quantifiers only.

The axiom of induction in the context of KP is stronger than the usual axiom of regularity, which amounts to applying induction to the complement of a set (the class of all sets not in the given set).

Related definitions 
 An ordinal number  is called an admissible ordinal if L is an admissible set.
 L is called an amenable set if it is a standard model of KP set theory without the axiom of Δ0-collection.

Theorems

Admissible sets 
The ordinal α is an admissible ordinal if and only if α is a limit ordinal and there does not exist a γ < α for which there is a Σ1(Lα) mapping from γ onto α.  If M is a standard model of KP, then the set of ordinals in M is an admissible ordinal.

Cartesian products exist 
Theorem:

If A and B are sets, then there is a set A×B which consists of all ordered pairs (a, b) of elements a of A and b of B.

Proof:

The set {a} (which is the same as {a, a} by the axiom of extensionality) and the set {a, b} both exist by the axiom of pairing. Thus 

exists by the axiom of pairing as well.

A possible Δ0 formula expressing that p stands for (a, b) is:

Thus a superset of A×{b} = {(a, b) | a ∈ A} exists by the axiom of collection.

Then the following formula is also Δ0

Thus A×{b} itself exists by the axiom of separation.

If v is intended to stand for A×{b}, then a Δ0 formula expressing that is:

Thus a superset of {A×{b} | b ∈ B} exists by the axiom of collection.

Putting  in front of that last formula and we get from the axiom of separation that the set {A×{b} | b ∈ B} itself exists.

Finally, A×B = {A×{b} | b ∈ B} exists by the axiom of union.

Q.E.D.

Metalogic 
The consistency strength of KPω is given by the Bachmann–Howard ordinal. KP fails to prove some common theorems in set theory, such as the Mostowski collapse lemma.

See also 
 Constructible universe
 Admissible ordinal
 Hereditarily countable set
 Kripke–Platek set theory with urelements

References

Bibliography

Systems of set theory